Air Commodore Edward Alexander Dimsdale Masterman,  (15 April 1880 – 26 August 1957) was a senior officer in the Royal Air Force in the first half of the 20th century.  After retiring from the RAF, he served as the first ever Commandant of the Observer Corps.

Service career
Masterman started his service career in the Royal Navy, attending the Britannia Naval College around 1894.

By 1911 Masterman had become involved in the Navy's efforts to build an experimental airship and the following year he was appointed Officer Commanding the Naval Airship Section.

During the First World War, Masterman served in the Royal Naval Air Service, commanding the Farnborough Airship Station and working in several technical posts; during this time he invented and patented the airship mooring mast with Barnes Wallis. With the establishment of the Royal Air Force on 1 April 1918, Masterman transferred to the new service. Just before the end of the war, he was promoted to brigadier general and appointed General Officer Commanding No. 22 Group. When separate RAF ranks were introduced on 1 August 1919 he became an Air Commodore. In 1922 Masterman was appointed as Commandant of the RAF's Central Flying School.

Observer Corps
Between 1 March 1929 when he retired from the RAF and 1 April 1936, Masterman was the Commandant of the Observer Corps and was the first former RAF officer to hold this appointment. Headquarters Royal Observer Corps was located at Hillingdon House, RAF Uxbridge, only relocating to RAF Bentley Priory after Masterman retired. He was succeeded as Commandant Observer Corps by Air Commodore Alfred Warrington-Morris.

Following his retirement as Commandant, Air Commodore Masterman immediately rejoined the Royal Observer Corps as a civilian part-time volunteer with the rank of Observer Captain (the equivalent of the RAF Group Captain) and served as the ROC's Western Area Commandant between 1937 and 1942, although by special permission of Warrington-Morris, he was permitted to wear his RAF Air Commodore's uniform and rank braid after April 1941 when the Observer Corps became the Royal Observer Corps and part of RAF Fighter Command.

References

External links
Air of Authority – A History of RAF Organisation – Air Commodore Edward Masterman
Obituary in the Hampshire Field Club Magazine

|-
 

|-
 

|-
 

|-

1880 births
1953 deaths
Graduates of Britannia Royal Naval College
Royal Air Force generals of World War I
Commanders of the Order of the British Empire
Companions of the Order of St Michael and St George
Companions of the Order of the Bath
Recipients of the Air Force Cross (United Kingdom)
Royal Navy officers
Royal Naval Air Service aviators
People of the Royal Observer Corps